The Billboard Global 200 is a chart that ranks the best-performing songs globally. Its data, published by Billboard magazine and compiled by MRC Data, is based on digital sales and online streaming from over 200 territories worldwide. Another similar chart is the Billboard Global Excl. US chart, which follows the same formula except it covers all territories excluding the US. The two charts launched on September 19, 2020.

On the Global 200, three singles have reached number one in 2023 so far. Four artists reached the top of the chart for the first time—SZA, Miley Cyrus, Karol G, and Shakira. Miley Cyrus has spent the most weeks at the top spot so far with 6 weeks at number one for her single "Flowers".

On the Global Excl. US, three singles have reached number one in 2023 so far. Five artists reached the top of the chart for the first time—Rema, Selena Gomez, Miley Cyrus, Karol G, and Shakira. Miley Cyrus has spent the most weeks at the top spot so far with 6 weeks at number one for her single "Flowers".

Chart history

See also
 2023 in music
 List of Billboard 200 number-one albums of 2023
 List of Billboard Hot 100 number ones of 2023

References

Global 200
2023